Greenslade is an eponymous studio album by British progressive rock band Greenslade, released in 1973, and their first album. The artwork for the album cover is by Roger Dean. The album has seven tracks comprising six songs and one instrumental with a vocal track.

Background
The song "Feathered Friends" was issued as a promotional single, with "An English Western" and "Temple Song" on the B-side. A second single, on general release was issued in May 1973 with "Temple Song" on the A-side and "An English Western" on the B-side.

Reception
Reviewing the album, planetmellotron.com said, "The album is pretty laid-back, with big themes rather than particularly strong melodies, but they made a good noise, and really didn't sound much like anyone else."

Track listing
All music written by Dave Greenslade and lyrics written by Dave Lawson, except where noted.

Note: The timing for "Drowning Man" is incorrectly given as 6:40 on the sleeve of the original release.

Personnel
Greenslade
 Dave Lawson – keyboards, vocals
 Dave Greenslade – keyboards, co-producer
 Tony Reeves – bass guitar, double bass, co-producer
 Andrew McCulloch – drums, percussion
Technical
 Stuart Taylor – co-producer
 Mike Bobak – engineer
 Roger Dean - cover artwork

Release history

References

External links
 

Greenslade albums
1973 debut albums
Albums with cover art by Roger Dean (artist)
Warner Records albums
Albums recorded at Morgan Sound Studios